T-114 was a minesweeper of the Soviet Navy during World War II. Upon completion she was transferred to the Soviet Union under Lend-Lease as T-114; she was never returned to the United States. Because of the Cold War, the U.S. Navy was unaware of this fate and the vessel remained on the American Naval Vessel Register until she was struck on 1 January 1983.

Career 
Alchemy was laid down on 8 June 1942 at Tampa, Florida, by the Tampa Shipbuilding Co.; sponsored by Mrs. W. E. Edgarton; and completed on 11 August 1943. On the same day that she was completed, Alchemy was turned over to the Soviet Navy under the terms of the lend-lease program.

Alchemy was carried on the American Navy List as MSF-141 after 7 February 1955, until struck on 1 January 1983.

References

External links
 Dictionary of American Naval Fighting Ships 
 NavSource Online: Mine Warfare Vessel Photo Archive – Alchemy (MSF 141) – ex-AM-141 – ex-AMc-118

Admirable-class minesweepers
Ships built in Tampa, Florida
1942 ships
World War II minesweepers of the United States
Admirable-class minesweepers of the Soviet Navy
World War II minesweepers of the Soviet Union
Ships sunk by German submarines in World War II
Maritime incidents in August 1944
Shipwrecks in the Kara Sea
World War II shipwrecks in the Arctic Ocean